Jerzy Markuszewski (16 December 1930 – 16 October 2007) was a Polish theater director and anti-Communist dissident. Born in Warsaw, Markuszewski was one of the co-signers of Letter of 59, which protested the altering of the Constitution of the People's Republic of Poland in 1975.

Markuszewski died in Warsaw, Poland, on 16 October 2007.

External links
Jerzy Markuszewski obituary (Polish)

1930 births
2007 deaths
Polish democracy activists
Polish theatre directors
Knights of the Order of Polonia Restituta
Officers of the Order of Polonia Restituta
Commanders of the Order of Polonia Restituta
Recipients of the Silver Medal for Merit to Culture – Gloria Artis
Polish dissidents
Recipient of the Meritorious Activist of Culture badge